Hermann Uhde (July 20, 1914 – October 10, 1965) was a German Wagnerian bass-baritone. He was born in Bremen and died on stage of a heart attack during a performance in Copenhagen.

He studied in his hometown, where he gave his début in 1936. During the war, he sang in Munich and at the opera of The Hague (then occupied by German troops). He sang at the Salzburg Festival from 1949 on (singing the role of Kreon in the premiere of Carl Orff's Antigonae), at the Bayreuth Festival from 1951 on and at the Metropolitan Opera from 1955 to 1964.

He began as a low, dark bass, and later moved up to baritone. He continued singing low bass roles occasionally, such as the Grand Inquisitor from Don Carlos.

The cutting quality of his voice and diction lead to him being cast in villainous roles at the Bayreuth Festival, such as Telramund and Klingsor, or in morally ambiguous roles such as Wotan, Gunther or the title role in Flying Dutchman.  In spite of being a famous singer, he often also sang small roles such as Donner in Das Rheingold, Melot in  Tristan und Isolde, the Grand Inquisitor in Don Carlos, and Shchelkalov in  Boris Godunov. In the United States, he created a sensation at the Metropolitan Opera in his debut title role as Wozzeck (sung in English), with Eleanor Steber singing Marie.

Selected discography
Parsifal - Hans Knappertsbusch, 1951
Das Rheingold - Joseph Keilberth, 1952
Götterdämmerung - Clemens Krauss, 1953
Lohengrin- Joseph Keilberth, 1953; also Eugen Jochum, 1954.
Der Fliegende Holländer- Hans Knappertsbusch, 1955
Das Rheingold and Siegfried - Rudolf Kempe, 1960
"A Portrait of Hermann Uhde" - Gala, catalogue number 100.749

External links 
Biography with pictures
 The Flying Dutchman, YouTube
 Lohengrin (with Astrid Varnay), YouTube

Operatic bass-baritones
1914 births
1965 deaths
Musicians who died on stage
Musicians from Bremen
German bass-baritones
20th-century German male opera singers